Eduardo Parra (born c. 1925) was a Chilean basketball player. He competed in the men's tournament at the 1948 Summer Olympics.

References

External links
 

1920s births
Possibly living people
Chilean men's basketball players
Olympic basketball players of Chile
Basketball players at the 1948 Summer Olympics